Bujar Idrizi (born 11 December 1991) is a Kosovar professional footballer who plays as a midfielder for Llapi.

Club career

Llapi
In July 2016, Idrizi completed a transfer to Llapi by penning a 12-month contract, returning in his hometown for the first time in two-and-a-half years. In the 2016–17 season, he went on to make 29 league appearances, scoring once as Llapi finished 3rd, four points short of Europa League first qualifying round. He also played in the Kosovar Cup final in a losing effort to Besa Pejë.

Kukësi
Idrizi moved for the first time aboard Kosovo in June 2017 by signing with Albanian Superliga side Kukësi on a one-year contract. He began his season as an unused substitute in the 2017 Albanian Supercup match in which his team was defeated by Tirana. Idrizi played his first match for Kukësi later on 16 October by entering in the last 15 minutes of a 4–2 home win versus Teuta Durrës. He netted his maiden Kukësi goal on 4 March of the following, the opener of the 2–1 win at bottom side Lushnja. Idrizi concluded his first season at Kukësi by playing 31 matches between league and cup, as Kukësi finished runner-up in championship and was knocked-out by Laçi in the Albanian Cup. Following the end of the season, Idrizi left the club after he was not given a contract renewal.

Career statistics

References

External links
FSHF profile

1991 births
Living people
Sportspeople from Podujevo
Kosovan footballers
Association football defenders
KF Hysi players
KF Llapi players
KF Trepça players
KF Trepça'89 players
FK Kukësi players
Football Superleague of Kosovo players
Kategoria Superiore players
Kosovan expatriate footballers
Expatriate footballers in Albania
Kosovan expatriate sportspeople in Albania